A proleptic calendar is a calendar that is applied to dates before its introduction. Examples include:

 Proleptic Gregorian calendar
 Proleptic Julian calendar
 Symmetry454

Calendars